Vida Eterna is the first reggaeton album by Getto & Gastam and was released on November 19, 2002. The album contains 15 tracks and features the artists Tempo, Nicky Jam, Don Omar, Héctor el Father and Ivy Queen.

Track listing
 "Intro"
 "Tratan" 
 "Pégate"
 "Conspira" 
 "Bailando" 
 "Dame Tu Figura" 
 "Ombe' No Oficial"
 "No Se Tiren O Se Mueren" 
 "Interlude (Remix)"
 "Vengan Mujeres Al Baile"
 "Let's Ride" 
 "Soy Una Persona"
 "My Flow"
 "Muchos Quieren" 
 "Seguimos Aquí" 

2002 albums
Getto & Gastam albums